"Keep On Truckin'" is a 1973 hit song recorded by Eddie Kendricks for Motown Records' Tamla label. The clavinet-featuring song was Kendricks' first major hit as a solo artist, coming two years after his departure from The Temptations. "Keep On Truckin reached number one on both the Billboard Hot 100 and R&B Singles Chart upon its release, and was Kendricks' only number-one solo hit. It also reached #18 on the UK Charts. Vibes are played by Gary Coleman.

Background 
By 1973 Eddie Kendricks was two years into a solo career following his bitter split from The Temptations. While his former bandmates went on to record hits such as "Superstar (Remember How You Got Where You Are)" (which was a reported jab at Kendricks and fellow ex-Temptation David Ruffin), and their seven-minute opus, "Papa Was a Rollin' Stone", Kendricks had begun to reach a cult R&B fan base following his most recent two albums.

Working closely with Frank Wilson, who was the main producer in most of Kendricks' solo efforts, the duo worked on a song that would aim at the dance floor rather than the serene ballads that Kendricks was used to recording. His earlier single, "Girl You Need a Change of Mind", was a cult favorite for club fans. With co-writers Anita Poree (1939–2018) and Leonard Caston Jr., Wilson created a song rivaling that of the Temptations' Norman Whitfield-produced cinematic soul that had become commonplace among the group's recordings, but instead of instigating drama, the song's grooves were clearly aimed at the dance floor.

Upon its release in the summer of 1973, the song would finally bring Kendricks out of the shadow of his former band as the song's catchy beats and melody became a crossover hit. By late fall, the song had reached number one on the US pop and R&B singles chart, matching the performance of the biggest singles released by his former group. When "...Truckin became a hit, the Temptations' hit luster was waning, with "Hey Girl (I Like Your Style)" barely reaching the Top 40, and the follow-up funk song, "Let Your Hair Down", becoming only a modest hit (although an R&B #1). Much like their "Superstar", which would notably be covered by David Ruffin, Kendricks included a jab at his former bandmates with the lyric:

Chart performance

All-time charts

Personnel
Credits adapted from The Billboard Book of Number One Rhythm & Blues Hits.

Leonard Caston – clavinet, piano, writer, producer
James Jamerson – bass
Ed Greene – drums
Gary Coleman – percussion, vibes
King Errisson – congas
Dean Parks – guitar
Greg Poree – guitar
Jerry Peters – organ 
Anita Poree – writer
Frank Wilson – writer, producer

References

1973 singles
Eddie Kendricks songs
Billboard Hot 100 number-one singles
Cashbox number-one singles
Funk songs
Songs written by Frank Wilson (musician)
Motown singles
Tamla Records singles
Songs written by Leonard Caston Jr.
Songs written by Anita Poree
1973 songs
Song recordings produced by Frank Wilson (musician)